Jia (also Romanized as Jīā and Jeyā; also known as Giya) is a village in Chavarzaq Rural District, Chavarzaq District, Tarom County, Zanjan Province, Iran. At the 2006 census, its population was 583, in 157 families.

References 

Populated places in Tarom County